Richard John Sklba (born September 11, 1935) is an American prelate of the Roman Catholic Church who served as an auxiliary bishop of the Archdiocese of Milwaukee in Wisconsin from 1979 to 2010.

Biography

Early years 
Richard Sklba was born on September 11, 1935, in Racine, Wisconsin. He attended St. Catherine's High School in Racine for two years, then entered St. Francis Seminary in St. Francis, Wisconsin. In 1954, Sklba entered the Pontifical Gregorian University in Rome, earning a Bachelor of Philosophy degree and a Master of Theology degree.

Priesthood 
On December 20, 1959, Sklba was ordained to the priesthood by Archbishop Martin O’Connor for the Archdiocese of Milwaukee. After his ordination, Sklba served as assistant pastor at St. Mary's Parish in Elm Grove, Wisconsin, for two years.

In 1962, Sklba returned to Rome to study at the Pontifical Biblical Institute and the Pontifical University of St. Thomas Aquinas. In 1965, he earned a Doctor of Sacred Theology degree with a dissertation entitled "The teaching function of the Pre-exilic Israelite priesthood."

After returning to Wisconsin in 1965, Sklba performed weekend pastoral work at St. Veronica Parish in Milwaukee, and taught scripture at St. Francis Seminary for the next 11 years.

Auxiliary Bishop of Milwaukee 
On November 6, 1979, Pope John Paul II appointed Sklba as an auxiliary bishop of the Archdiocese of Milwaukee and titular bishop of Castro di Puglia. He was consecrated on December 19, 1979 by Archbishop Rembert Weakland, with Archbishops William Cousins and Robert Sanchez serving as co-consecrators.Sklba has been a member of the Catholic Biblical Association of America since 1968 and was named its president in 1982.

In 1998, Sklba delivered a eulogy at the funeral of Lawrence Murphy, an archdiocese priest. In the eulogy, Sklba alluded to good work done by Murphy, but stated that "some shadows had been cast on his ministry".  Before his death, Murphy had admitted to sexually abusing 30 students at St. John's School for the Deaf in St. Francis, Wisconsin, and was suspected in 200 additional cases. Critics accused Sklba of grossly understating Murphy's crimes against children.

From 2005 to 2008, Sklba served as chair of the United States Conference of Catholic Bishops' (USCCB) Committee on Ecumenical and Interreligious Affairs. In this capacity, following Pope Benedict XVI's reformulation of the Good Friday prayer for the Jews in the Tridentine Mass, Sklba stated: "Central to the concerns of the Holy Father is the clear articulation that salvation comes through faith in Jesus Christ and his church. It is a faith that must never be imposed but always freely chosen. The Catholic Church in the United States remains steadfastly committed to deepening its bonds of friendship and mutual understanding with the Jewish community."On October 18, 2010, Benedict XVI accepted Sklba's letter of resignation as auxiliary bishop of the Archdiocese of Milwaukee.

See also

 Catholic Church hierarchy
 Catholic Church in the United States
 Historical list of the Catholic bishops of the United States
 List of Catholic bishops of the United States
 Lists of patriarchs, archbishops, and bishops

References

External links
Roman Catholic Archdiocese of Milwaukee Official Site

1935 births
Living people
People from Racine, Wisconsin
20th-century American Roman Catholic titular bishops
Religious leaders from Wisconsin
St. Francis Seminary (Wisconsin) alumni
Pontifical University of Saint Thomas Aquinas alumni
Pontifical Biblical Institute alumni
21st-century American Roman Catholic titular bishops
Roman Catholic Archdiocese of Milwaukee
Catholics from Wisconsin